The Grim Comedian is a 1921 American silent drama film directed by Frank Lloyd and starring Phoebe Hunt, Jack Holt, and Gloria Hope.

Plot
As described in a film magazine, an automobile passenger tells an old man a tale, while speeding across the country, of the actress Marie Lamonte (Hunt) who gives up luxury, a beautiful car, and a cozy apartment furnished by Harvey "Million Dollar" Martin (Holt). She does all this so that her daughter Dorothy (Hope), who was reared in a convent, might not be contaminated by the presence of the roue. However, Harvey meets the young woman and a genuine affection springs up for her. On the day that they are to elope, Marie goes to Harvey's apartment, finds her daughter waiting in an adjoining room, and in desperation shoots Harvey, wounding him in the hand. "I did not think that you would do it," he says. "You've won." He forthright tells Dorothy that he did not intend to marry her. "The grim comedian" known as life has turned the tables on the millionaire when happiness was within his grasp.

Cast
 Phoebe Hunt as Marie Lamonte 
 Jack Holt as Harvey Martin 
 Gloria Hope as Dorothy 
 Bert Woodruff as Old Dad 
 Laura La Varnie as Gracie Moore 
 May Hopkins as Billie Page 
 John Harron as Geoffrey Hutchins 
 Joseph J. Dowling as Carleton Hutchins

References

Bibliography
 Munden, Kenneth White. The American Film Institute Catalog of Motion Pictures Produced in the United States, Part 1. University of California Press, 1997.

External links

1921 films
1921 drama films
Silent American drama films
Films directed by Frank Lloyd
American silent feature films
1920s English-language films
Goldwyn Pictures films
American black-and-white films
1920s American films